Bakersfield City School District is a Pre-Kindergarten - 8th grade public school district in Bakersfield, California. The district has 45 schools, and serves just over 30,000 students in much of the city of Bakersfield.

References

External links
 

School districts in Kern County, California
1870 establishments in California
School districts established in 1870